The fourth HMS Dominica (K507) was a Colony-class frigate of the United Kingdom which served in the Royal Navy during World War II. She originally was ordered by the United States Navy as the Tacoma-class patrol frigate USS Harman (PF-79) and was transferred to the Royal Navy prior to completion.

Construction and acquisition
The ship, originally designated a "patrol gunboat," PG-187, was ordered by the United States Maritime Commission under a United States Navy contract as USS Harman. She was reclassified as a "patrol frigate," PF-79, on 15 April 1943 and laid down by the Walsh-Kaiser Company at Providence, Rhode Island, on 27 July 1943. Intended for transfer to the United Kingdom, the ship was renamed Dominica by the British prior to launching and was launched on 14 September 1943, sponsored by Mrs. Andrew D. Manchester.

Service history
Transferred to the United Kingdom under Lend-Lease on 25 January 1944, the ship served in the Royal Navy as HMS Dominica (K507) on patrol and escort duty until 1945.

Disposal
The United Kingdom returned Dominica to the U.S. Navy on 23 April 1946. She was sold to the Sun Shipbuilding and Drydock Company of Chester, Pennsylvania, on 27 March 1947 for scrapping.

References 

NavSource Online: Frigate Photo Archive: HMS Dominica (K 507) ex-Harman ex-PF-79 ex-PG-187

External links 
Photo gallery of HMS Dominica

Tacoma-class frigates
Ships built in Providence, Rhode Island
1943 ships
World War II frigates and destroyer escorts of the United States
Colony-class frigates
World War II frigates of the United Kingdom